Clear Brook High School is a secondary school located in Friendswood, Texas, United States.

Notable alumni
Stephanie Beatriz, actress
Ben Emanuel, Safety, Calgary Stampeders CFL
Anthony Hill, NFL tight end
Ronnie Price, National Basketball Association (NBA) point guard
Michael Yo, actor, comedian
Jeff Bourns, Top 5 World Ranked Amputee Tennis Player

References

External links 

Clear Creek Independent School District high schools
High schools in Harris County, Texas
Public education in Houston
Educational institutions established in 1988
1988 establishments in Texas